Kamsa Meghwal (born 1968) is an Indian politician. She is a member of the Rajasthan Legislative Assembly and a Minister in the Government of Rajasthan.

In 2008, she was elected to the Rajasthan Legislative Assembly from Bhopalgarh constituency on a BJP ticket. She was reelected in 2013.

In December 2016, she was named Minister in charge of Tribal Area Development.

Meghwal is married with 2 sons.

References

Living people
1968 births
Women in Rajasthan politics
Members of the Rajasthan Legislative Assembly
People from Jodhpur district
State cabinet ministers of Rajasthan
Bharatiya Janata Party politicians from Rajasthan